Rhombomantis woodmasoni is a species of mantid in the family Mantidae. It is found in Asia

References

Further reading

 

Mantidae
Insects described in 1931